Labeo bottegi is fish in genus Labeo. It is known from Ethiopia, Kenya, and Somalia.

Named in honor of Italian Army officer Vittorio Bottego (1860-1897), who led expedition to Somalia (1895-1897), during which type specimen was collected.

References

bottegi
Fish of Ethiopia
Taxa named by Decio Vinciguerra
Cyprinid fish of Africa
Fish described in 1897